Sarıkoyak is a village in Çamlıyayla district of Mersin Province, Turkey. It a situated in the Taurus Mountains. The population of Sarıkoyak was 278 as of 2012.

References

Villages in Çamlıyayla District